The office of High Sheriff of West Glamorgan was established in 1974 as part of the creation of the county of West Glamorgan in Wales following the Local Government Act 1972. Together with the High Sheriff of Mid Glamorgan and the High Sheriff of South Glamorgan, it replaced the office of the High Sheriff of Glamorgan.

In recent years the High Sheriff of West Glamorgan has supported and chaired the CrimeBeat charity. For more information on the High Sheriff visit http://www.HighSheriffWestGlam.org.uk

High Sheriffs of West Glamorgan
Before 1974 – See High Sheriff of Glamorgan
1974: Alan Burnyeat Turnbull of Home Farm, Penrice, Reynoldston
1975: Claud Gerald Bellingham of Bishopston, Swansea
1976: Martin Thomas of Wern Road, Skewen
1977: Commodore Robert Hastie
1978: Donald Humphrey Davies of Caswell, Swansea
1979: Keith Cyril Austin Bailey of Caswell Bay, Swansea
1980: Michael Rowland Godfrey Llewellyn of Glebe House, Penmaen, Swansea
1981: Alexander Herbert Lindsey Eccles of Penmaen, Swansea
1982: Arthur Gordon Chilcott, of Caswell Road, Mumbles, Swansea
1983: David Hunter Andrews of Sefn Bryn House, Penmaen, Swansea
1984: Brian Brendan Hickey T.D., of Blackpill, Swansea
1985: Edward Gwynne Thomas, of Caswell Avenue, Mumbles, Swansea
1986: Eden Martin Hughes Evans 
1987: Richard Vernon Watkins
1988: Dr Stuart Poole Jenkins
1989: Dr Brian Kay Davison
1990: John Brian Dickinson Simpson 
1991: Dr Edward Morgan Roberts
1992: William Isaac James
1993: Alan Charles Frederick Aylesbury
1994: Colin Reginald Rees
1995: John Duart Willard MacLean
1996: Robert Lewis
1997: Paul Jeremy Hodges
1998: Robert Hugh Lloyd-Griffiths
1999: Henry Alfred Steane
2000: Rosalyn Joy Harris
2001: David Peter Lloyd Davies
2002: Royston Phelps
2003: Mrs Jane Elizabeth Clayton
2004: D. Byron Lewis
2005: Dr Eleanor Mair Williams
2006: Philip Llewellyn Hunkin
2007: Martin Andrew Trainer
2008: Pamela Edith Spender  
2009: Dr Ronald Bryn John of Port Talbot  
2010: Rowland William Parry Jones of West Cross  
2011: Susan Mary Waller Thomas of Caswell 
2012: William Thomas Hopkins of Caswell 
2013: Gaynor Richards, MBE 
2014: Martyn Spencer Jenkins of Langland, Swansea 
2015: Robert Michael Redfern of Glyncasnod, Felindre, Swansea  
2016: Professor Donna Mead, OBE, of Glynneath 
2017: Mrs Roberta Louise Fleet 
2018: Henry Michael Gilbert of Mumbles 
2019: Ms Sally Ruth Goldstone, Sketty Green, Swansea  
2020: Debra Elizabeth Evans-Williams 
2021: Mrs Joanna Lewis Jenkins, OBE
2022: Stephen Hugh Rogers
2023: Alan Brayley

References
High Sheriff of West Glamorgan

 
West Glamorgan
West Glamorgan